Ceropegia vincifolia is a species of flowering plant in the family Apocynaceae, native to Western Ghats, in India.

References

vincifolia